In Greek mythology, Cleolla or Cleola (Ancient Greek: Κλεόλλα) was the daughter of Dias, the son of Pelops, and by some accounts the mother, or grandmother, of Agamemnon and Menelaus.

Most accounts have Agamemnon and Menelaus, as the sons of Atreus, the son of Pelops, and Aerope. However according to the Byzantine scholar John Tzetzes (citing "Hesiod, Aeschylus, and some others"), she was, by her first cousin Pleisthenes (the son of Atreus and Aerope), the mother of Agamemnon, Menelaus and Anaxibia, while, according to the scholia to Euripides Orestes 4, she was married to her uncle Atreus, and was the mother by him of Pleisthenes who became the father of Agamemnon and Menelaus and Anaxibia (by Eriphyle).

Notes

References 
 Fowler, R. L., Early Greek Mythography: Volume 2: Commentary, Oxford University Press, 2013. .
 Gantz, Timothy, Early Greek Myth: A Guide to Literary and Artistic Sources, Johns Hopkins University Press, 1996, Two volumes:  (Vol. 1),  (Vol. 2).
 Grimal, Pierre, The Dictionary of Classical Mythology, Wiley-Blackwell, 1996. .
 Hard, Robin, The Routledge Handbook of Greek Mythology: Based on H.J. Rose's "Handbook of Greek Mythology", Psychology Press, 2004, . Google Books.
 Most, G.W., Hesiod: The Shield, Catalogue of Women, Other Fragments, Loeb Classical Library, No. 503, Cambridge, Massachusetts, Harvard University Press, 2007, 2018. . Online version at Harvard University Press.
 Parada, Carlos, Genealogical Guide to Greek Mythology, Jonsered, Paul Åströms Förlag, 1993. .

Women in Greek mythology